Jessy Bénet (born 24 January 1995) is a French professional footballer who plays as a midfielder for  club Grenoble.

Club career
After playing for Montceau during the latter stages of his youth development, Bénet made his debut for the club on 20 October 2012, coming on as an 80th minute substitute in a 4–0 loss away to Mulhouse. During his first season playing for Montceau in the Championnat National 2, Bénet made 21 league appearances, scoring his first senior goal in a 3–0 home victory against Paris Saint-Germain II on 4 May 2013. The following season, Bénet made 19 league appearances, scoring five times for Montceau, as the club finished 14th.

Ahead of the 2014–15 Ligue 2 season, Bénet signed for Dijon. In his first season at the club, Bénet made eight league appearances for Dijon, starting four times, as well as appearing six times for Dijon's reserves in the Championnat National 3, scoring three times. In 2015–16, Bénet fell further out of favour at Dijon, playing just 98 minutes of football across eight league games; being primarily used in the National 3 for Dijon B. On 30 June 2016, Bénet was loaned out to Championnat National side Avranches, making 35 appearances across all competitions, scoring three times. Despite battling relegation for the majority of the season, during his time at Avranches, Bénet was part of the side that reached the quarter-finals of the Coupe de France. On 30 August 2018, Bénet was once again loaned out, this time to Grenoble. Bénet made 25 league appearances for Grenoble, scoring three times, as the club won promotion back to Ligue 2.

In June 2018, Bénet signed for Grenoble on a permanent basis on a three-year contract. After finishing ninth in Ligue 2 for two consecutive seasons, Grenoble finished fourth in the 2020–21 season, with Bénet contributing nine goals and seven assists in his self proclaimed "best season professionally", qualifying for the promotion play-offs, eventually losing to Toulouse in the second round.

On 7 September 2021, following the expiry of his contract with Grenoble, he signed a three-year contract with Amiens.

On 13 January 2023, Bénet returned to Grenoble.

International career
In October 2014, Bénet made two appearances for France's under-20's in a double header against the Czech Republic, scoring on his second appearance on 9 October 2014, two days after making his debut.

References

External links

 
 
 

1995 births
Living people
Sportspeople from Le Creusot
Footballers from Bourgogne-Franche-Comté
Association football midfielders
French footballers
France youth international footballers
FC Montceau Bourgogne players
Dijon FCO players
Grenoble Foot 38 players
Amiens SC players
Ligue 2 players
Championnat National players